Jane Lucy Lightfoot  (born 1969) is a British classical scholar. She is Professor of Greek Literature at the University of Oxford and a fellow of New College, Oxford.

Early life and education
Lightfoot was born in 1969 in Liverpool, England. She was educated at The Belvedere School, an all-girls private school. She then studied Classics at St John's College, Oxford, graduating with a first class Bachelor of Arts (BA) degree in 1992: as per tradition, her BA was promoted to a Master of Arts (MA Oxon) degree in 1994. She stayed at Oxford to study for a Doctor of Philosophy (DPhil) degree, and was a Jubilee Scholar at St Hugh's College, Oxford, for the 1993/94 academic year and a Prize Fellow at All Souls College, Oxford, from 1994. She completed her doctorate in 1995 with a thesis titled "Parthenius" (concerning the ancient Greek poet, Parthenius of Nicaea), for which she won the Conington Prize.

Academic career
Lightfoot was awarded a Prize Fellowship at All Souls College, Oxford, in 1994, while she was a doctoral student at the University of Oxford, which she held until 2000. Then, from 2000 to 2003, she was a post-doctoral fellow at All Souls. She has been a fellow and tutor in classics at New College, Oxford, since 2003. In 2014, she was awarded a Title of Distinction by the University of Oxford as "Professor of Greek Literature".

Her research interests include most aspects of Greek literature, with her publications focusing primarily on Hellenistic and imperial literature. Her specialism is in the exploration of underrepresented classical texts, including mythography, ethnography, oracular literature, poetry and prose. Her current work is a critical interpretation of late antique astrological poetry.

Honours
Lightfoot was elected a Fellow of the British Academy (FBA) in 2018, the United Kingdom's national academy for the humanities and social sciences. She is an Honorary Fellow of St John's College, Oxford.

Selected publications 

 Parthenius of Nicaea (Oxford, 1999)
 Lucian, On the Syrian Goddess (Oxford, 2003)
 The Sibylline Oracles (Oxford, 2007)
 A Hellenistic Collection (Cambridge, MA, 2009)
 Dionysius Periegetes, Description of the Known World: With Introduction, Translation, and Commentary (Oxford, 2014)
 Pseudo-Manetho, Apotelesmatica, Books Two, Three, and Six: Edited with Introduction, Translation, and Commentary (Oxford, 2020)
 Pseudo-Manetho, Apotelesmatica, Books Four, One, and Five: Edited with Introduction, Translation, and Commentary (Oxford, 2023)

References 

Living people
Women classical scholars
Alumni of the University of Oxford
Fellows of All Souls College, Oxford
Fellows of the British Academy
Fellows of New College, Oxford
People educated at The Belvedere Academy
Classical scholars of the University of Oxford
1969 births